The Rule of Ming and Zhang refers to the reigns of Emperor Ming (r. 58–75) and Emperor Zhang (r. 75–88) of the Eastern Han dynasty, which was considered the golden age of that dynasty. Both Emperors Ming and Zhang were generally regarded as able administrators who cared about the welfare of the people and who promoted officials with integrity.  After Emperor Zhang's death, the dynasty began to gradually decline.

See also
Rule of Wen and Jing
Golden ages of China

References

Han dynasty
1st century in China